The Brisbane Lions' 2002 season was its sixth season in the Australian Football League (AFL). In it, the club won its second consecutive premiership, and second overall.

Season summary

Premiership Season

Home and away season

Finals series

Ladder

References

Brisbane Lions Season, 2002
Brisbane Lions seasons